The 1933 Vanderbilt Commodores football team represented Vanderbilt University as a member of the Southeastern Conference (SEC) during the 1933 college football season. The 1933 season was Dan McGugin's 29th year as head coach the first year of play for the SEC. Vanderbilt was a founding member of the conference.

Schedule

References

Vanderbilt
Vanderbilt Commodores football seasons
Vanderbilt Commodores football